The 2000 Solihull Metropolitan Borough Council election took place on 4 May 2000 to elect members of Solihull Metropolitan Borough Council in the West Midlands, England. 
One third of the council was up for election and the Conservative party gained overall control of the council from no overall control.

Campaign
Solihull was a top target for the Conservatives in the 2000 local elections with the party needing 2 gains to win an overall majority. Among the councillors defending seats in the election were the Conservative leader of the council in Castle Bromwich ward and the Labour group leader.

The Conservatives campaigned on promises to protect the green belt and carefully manage the council's finances, while the national party's hard line on asylum seekers was also seen by the party as helping in the election. Labour defended its strongholds in the north of the council area, pledging to target spending on addressing social problems in an area with high unemployment.

Election result
The results saw the Conservatives win a majority of 5 on the council to have majority control for the first time since 1991. Solihull also became the first metropolitan borough with a Conservative majority since the mid-1990s. The Conservative gained Elmdon from the Labour party, Packwood and Shirley East from the Liberal Democrats and Shirley South where an independent councillor stood down at the election. Meanwhile, the Labour group leader Mick Corser lost the election in Bickenhill after having been deselected in his previous ward of Fordbridge. Overall turnout in the election was 30.1%, a rise from 28.3% in 1999.

The Labour party blamed the threatened closure of the Longbridge plant for a disappointing performance in the election, while the Conservatives put their success down to local campaigning and the national issue of pensions only going up by 75 pence. Following the election the former deputy group leader Hugh Hendry was elected as the new leader of the Labour group.

This result had the following consequences for the total number of seats on the council after the elections :

Ward results

|- style="background-color:#F6F6F6"
! style="background-color: " |
| colspan="2"   | Conservative gain from Independent Ratepayers 
| align="right" | Swing
| align="right" | +3.7
|-

By-elections between 2000 and 2002

References

2000 English local elections
2000
2000s in the West Midlands (county)